Francis Burton may refer to:
Francis Burton (1696–1744), member of parliament for Coleraine, and for Clare
Francis Burton (died 1832) (c. 1744–1832), MP and Justice of Chester
Francis Burton, 2nd Baron Conyngham (c. 1725–1787), Irish peer and politician
Francis Burton (Ennis MP) (died 1714), Irish politician
Francis G. Burton (1840–1915), British engineer and accountant
Francis H. Burton (1817–1872), Ontario businessman and political figure
Francis Nathaniel Burton (1766–1832), Canadian politician
Francis Robert Burton (1840–1915), public servant in South Australia

See also
Frank Burton (disambiguation)
Richard Francis Burton (1821–1890), British explorer